"Baharon Phool Barsao" or "Baharon Phool Barsao, Mera Mehboob Aaya Hain" ( "Seasons of spring, shower with flowers, my beloved has come") is an Indian Hindi song from the Bollywood film Suraj (1966). The lyrics were written by Hasrat Jaipuri, the music was composed by Shankar Jaikishan and the song was sung by Mohammed Rafi. The music of the song was composed in Dadra tala.

Hasrat Jaipuri received the Filmfare Awards of the best lyricist for this song in 1967. In 1966 Mohammed Rafi also won the Filmfare prize in the category of the best male playback singer. In a poll conducted by the BBC Radio in 2013, this song was voted as the most popular song in a list of the top 100 popular Bollywood songs of all time.

Awards

References

External links 
 Full video at YouTube

Hindi-language songs
1966 songs
Indian songs
Mohammed Rafi songs
Songs with music by Shankar Jaikishan